is a former Japanese football player. She played for Japan national team.

Club career
Uchiyama was born in Hyogo Prefecture on December 13, 1972. She played for Tasaki Kobe (1989–1991) and Prima Ham FC Kunoichi (1992–1999). At Prima Ham FC Kunoichi, the club won the L.League championship 2 times in 1995 and 1999. She was also selected Best Eleven 2 times (1995 and 1999).

National team career
In May 1991, when Uchiyama was 18 years old, she was selected Japan national team for 1991 AFC Championship in Fukuoka. At this competition, on May 26, she debuted against North Korea. She also played at 1994, 1998 Asian Games, 1995, 1997 and 1999 AFC Championship. She was also a member of Japan for 1991, 1995, 1999 World Cup and 1996 Summer Olympics. She played 58 games and scored 26 goals for Japan until 1999.

National team statistics

References

External links
 

1972 births
Living people
Association football people from Hyōgo Prefecture
Japanese women's footballers
Japan women's international footballers
Nadeshiko League players
Tasaki Perule FC players
Iga FC Kunoichi players
1991 FIFA Women's World Cup players
1995 FIFA Women's World Cup players
1999 FIFA Women's World Cup players
Olympic footballers of Japan
Footballers at the 1996 Summer Olympics
Asian Games medalists in football
Footballers at the 1994 Asian Games
Footballers at the 1998 Asian Games
Women's association football forwards
Asian Games silver medalists for Japan
Asian Games bronze medalists for Japan
Medalists at the 1994 Asian Games
Medalists at the 1998 Asian Games